Rishi Dhawan (born 19 February 1990) is an Indian cricketer who plays first-class and List A cricket for Himachal Pradesh. Dhawan is primarily a medium-fast bowling all-rounder who bats in the middle-order. Dhawan has played for Kings XI Punjab in the 2008 IPL. He was signed-up by the Mumbai Indians in 2013. In February 2017, he was bought by the Kolkata Knight Riders team for the 2017 Indian Premier League for 55 lakhs. For his huge contribution to the state team and single handed efforts in games, he is often hailed as finest cricketer Himachal Pradesh has ever produced.

He made his One Day International debut for India against Australia on 17 January 2016. He made his Twenty20 International (T20I) debut against Zimbabwe at Harare Sports Club on 18 June 2016.

He was the leading run-scorer for Himachal Pradesh in the 2018–19 Ranji Trophy, with 519 runs in eight matches. In December 2021, Dhawan led Himachal Pradesh to their maiden title in Indian domestic cricket, beating Tamil Nadu in the final of the 2021–22 Vijay Hazare Trophy. Dhawan put in a strong all round showing in the tournament, finishing as the second highest run scorer with 458 runs at an average of 76 and the second highest wicket taker with 17 wickets at an average of 23 in eight matches. Following this, in February 2022, he was bought by the Punjab Kings in the auction for the 2022 Indian Premier League tournament.

References

External links

Rishi Dhawan's profile page on Wisden

Living people
1990 births
Indian cricketers
India One Day International cricketers
India Twenty20 International cricketers
Himachal Pradesh cricketers
People from Mandi, Himachal Pradesh
Mumbai Indians cricketers
Punjab Kings cricketers
Cricketers from Himachal Pradesh
Agrani Bank Cricket Club cricketers
Legends of Rupganj cricketers